also known as , and  (Lealtad Plantation in English) is a historic coffee plantation in barrio La Torre, Lares, Puerto Rico. A large hacienda, it was founded in 1830, by Juan Bautista Plumey, a French immigrant, who arrived in Puerto Rico with enslaved people. (Juan Bautista Plumey was born in France on September 8, 1797, and named Jean Baptiste Henri Plumey.)

It would become the largest coffee plantation in Lares, with over thirty slaves and hundreds of day laborers working the 69  of coffee farm. For many years the plantation was a large producer and exporter of coffee. In 1880, it was owned by  Miguel Marquez Enseñat.

It is now owned by Edwin Soto and his family, who invested millions into its restoration and operate the hacienda as a hotel, coffee shop and a living museum recreating the historical setting of the height of coffee production in Puerto Rico. Coffee growing in Puerto Rico has seen a resurgence and Hacienda Lealtad produces coffee under the brand Café Lealtad. The  on Puerto Rico Highway 128 kilometer 55.8, is where groups meet for the start of their tour of the 19th century coffee plantation.

Brief history

Lares was founded on April 26, 1827, and became an important location of coffee production in Puerto Rico. In 1830, Juan Bautista Plumey established Hacienda Lealtad, the coffee producing farm. Plumey, a French immigrant had come to Lares with 32 slaves.  On May 20, 1833, he married Petronila Irizarry from nearby San Sebastián, Puerto Rico (Pepino) and they had twelve children. José María Marxuach Echavarría, twice mayor of San Juan, married one of Juan Bautista Plumey daughters.

After Plumey established Hacienda Lealtad, it became the largest and most modern of its time given it was the first to generate its own electricity to power the hacienda's machinery and mills. A canal and aqueduct guided water from the mountainside to a 17-foot hydraulic wheel to generate power to the plantation.

By 1846, Juan Bautista Plumey's hacienda which at the time was called  "was the only property labeled as an hacienda in official documents. He had 69 cuerdas planted in coffee worked by 33 slaves." Plumey did not allow his workers to work on any other farm.

In 1868, Lares was the site of Grito de Lares, a two-day revolt against the crown of Spain. While some documents state that people from Hacienda Lealtad participated in the revolt, a historian named Joseph Harrison Flores, with the National Archives of Puerto Rico, studied the history of the estate and Grito de Lares stated that only an eight-year-old child of a slave from Hacienda Lealtad was at the revolt, and spent 6 months in prison.

In 1873, slavery was abolished and a few years later, "by the 1880s coffee had replaced sugar as Puerto Rico's leading export staple and principal source of wealth."

In 1880, when it was called Hacienda Paraiso, it was owned by Miguel Marquez Enseñat who paid workers with hacienda token money, which could only be used to purchase goods from a store at the hacienda itself.

Coffee production and exportation dropped considerably after Puerto Rico was acquired by the United States- with the 1898 Treaty of Paris, and eventually, the plantation fell into disuse and decline.

The place had sentimental value to Edwin Soto, a Puerto Rican businessman from Lares, who had picked ripe coffee beans there as a child, with his family. Soto who had become a self-made millionaire decided he would buy the hacienda as a second home. While Soto's initial intentions for the property, when he purchased it in 2007, were to keep it as a second home he later decided to conserve it for its historic importance. Soto invested millions of dollars into its restoration and  now it is now a living museum with tours by appointment, a hotel, coffee shop, and educational tours for local and international tourists. It also serves as a place for people in the agriculture and coffee industry to meet and hold workshops.

In 2014, the Puerto Rico Department of Agriculture began an initiative to develop agricultural tourism and in 2016,  was endorsed by the Puerto Rico Tourism Company. Since the start of its restoration Café Lealtad, Inc., as the company is called, has purchased coffee seeds and other equipment and services from the Puerto Rico Department of Agriculture.

Students of agriculture and members of agricultural associations visit  in groups for workshops and as Puerto Rico continues to strengthen its agricultural industry, thirty Puerto Rican farmers completed an intensive, eight-week course on the business side of agriculture, at the hacienda.

Tours were underway regularly until Hurricane Maria hit on September 20, 2017. A week after a relieved Soto reported that Hurricane Irma had not done much damage to the coffee trees on the estate, Hurricane Maria destroyed all the coffee trees, around 60,000. Clean-up, restoration and planting began anew soon afterwards and tours and functions at the hacienda resumed.

A few months after Hurricane Maria struck, a meeting was held by the Secretary of Agriculture, farmers and stakeholders at Hacienda Lealtad.

Attractions 

The 19th century, coffee farming culture of Puerto Rico where jornaleros and slaves processed coffee for its distribution to Europe, is on display at Hacienda Lealtad. Educational tours where people can learn about coffee cultivation are available, by reservation, and the main attractions are:

 a former post office
 the landowner's house
 a coffee drying field and drawers for protecting coffee beans from rain 
 a mill to process the beans
 a cell made of stone which was used for imprisoning slaves
 coffee trees 
 a museum with furniture belonging to family of José de Diego, a Puerto Rican poet 
 Café Lealtad coffee
 a nearby creek 
 former slave quarters with kitchen with wood-burning stove

Coffee growing
There's been a resurgence in coffee growing in Puerto Rico, despite the lack of manpower and other challenges facing coffee farm landowners. Hacienda Lealtad in Lares has a coffee shop called Café Bistro Hacienda Lealtad. Café Lareño Coffee Shop is nearby and other such chic coffee shops have opened up along the mountainous hilltops of Lares and other municipalities in Puerto Rico. Lares has been the Puerto Rican municipality with the largest emigration to the mainland United States, since being hit by a severe economic recession.

In media and popular culture
The dress worn by Keysi Vargas, Puerto Rican contestant in the 2015 Miss World Beauty pageant, represented Hacienda Lealtad coffee.

In 2015, a made-for-television movie,  (Puerto Rican Cinderella) was filmed at Hacienda Lealtad and released on Telemundo.

Gallery
Scenes around Hacienda Lealtad:

See also

 Museo Hacienda Buena Vista
 List of hotels in Puerto Rico
 African diaspora in the Americas
 Slavery in the Spanish New World colonies
 French immigration to Puerto Rico

References

External links 
 Puerto Rican coffee vocabulary
Hacienda Lealtad documents in the National Archives database (Spanish)
Video of Hacienda Lealtad restoration project
 Hacienda Lealtad Facebook page

Farm museums in Puerto Rico
Historic house museums in Puerto Rico
Hotels in Puerto Rico
Lares, Puerto Rico
Historic sites in Puerto Rico
Puerto Rico
Slavery in the Caribbean
Cultural history of Puerto Rico
Coffee production
Lealtad